Roxane Berard (born Guillaume) (January 21, 1933 - December 31, 2019), was a Belgian-born actress who was the leading lady in various episodes of thirty-four different American television series between 1958 and 1967. One notable appearance was in 1964 when she played Ninette Rovel who murdered her husband Armand in the Perry Mason episode "The Case of the Fifty Millionth Frenchman." Berard had a gamine quality similar to fellow Belgian Audrey Hepburn's, with whom she was inevitably and continuously compared, especially since they resembled each other rather closely, and Berard frequently worked with a French accent.

The television series in which she was the focus of individual episodes included  Rawhide (with Clint Eastwood), Colt .45 with Wayde Preston, Maverick in which she made two appearances with James Garner and one apiece with Roger Moore and Jack Kelly, most notably "Game of Chance" with Garner, Kelly, and Marcel Dalio, 77 Sunset Strip with Efrem Zimbalist Jr., Zorro with Guy Williams, The Deputy with Allen Case, Have Gun - Will Travel in which she appeared as the leading lady in three episodes with Richard Boone, Bronco with Ty Hardin, Bourbon Street Beat with Andrew Duggan, Surfside Six, The Tab Hunter Show, Straightaway, Perry Mason and Get Smart.  Berard was a San Diego-based mural painter.

References

External links

 

1933 births
2019 deaths
Belgian emigrants to the United States
Actresses from Los Angeles
Actresses from San Diego
20th-century American actresses
21st-century American women